Elina Groberman (born 16 February 1983) is a Moldova-born American chess player who holds the FIDE title of Woman International Master (WIM, 2000). She is a co-winner of the U.S. Women's Chess Championship (2000).

Biography
In 1995, she moved to the United States with her family. Groberman won the New York State Women's Chess Championships three years in a row (1996-1998). In 1998, she won the Pan American Youth Girl's Chess Championship in the U18 age group. Three times she participated in the World Junior Chess Championship (1997-1999). In 2000, Groberman shared first place with Camilla Baginskaite in the U.S. Women's Chess Championship. In 2001, Elina Groberman participated in Women's World Chess Championship by knock-out system and in the first round lost to Nana Ioseliani.

In 2000, she was awarded the FIDE Woman International Master (WIM) title.

Later, Groberman rarely participated in chess tournaments. She graduated from the Massachusetts Institute of Technology and worked for Deutsche Bank Securities Inc.

Literature
 Игорь Бердичевский. Шахматная еврейская энциклопедия. Москва: Русский шахматный дом, 2016 (Igor Berdichevsky. The Chess Jewish Encyclopedia. Moscow: Russian Chess House, 2016)

References

External links
 
 
 
 

1983 births
Living people
Sportspeople from Chișinău
American female chess players
Chess Woman International Masters
Massachusetts Institute of Technology alumni
21st-century American women